Mack Life Records is a record label, founded in the late 1990s by the British-American R&B musician Mark Morrison. His single "Return of the Mack" was a UK No. 1 in 1996. The song peaked at No. 2 in the United States the following year.

On April 22, 2020, Mack Life announced its return as an independent label, focused on developing new talent. The first release, a debut single entitled "Train" by Portuguese, Leicester-based singer, Rhea Sun. The single premiered on Jazz FM, and along with its remixes, amassed over 3 Million streams on streaming platform Spotify, while reaching Top-20 on the official UK Soul Chart.

Later in 2020, Morrison opened Mack Life's own recording studio in Leicester, UK, offering free studio time, through a ‘Drop the Knife, Pick up the Mic’ campaign, in a bid to help combat youth crime.

According to music analytics website Songstats, as of January 1st 2023, Mack Life Records independent catalogue had exceeded 11 million streams on Spotify, and 2 million plays on TikTok.

Discography

Studio albums

Singles

References

British record labels